Balyk (from Turkic balïq) is the salted and dried soft parts of fish, usually coming from large valuable species: acipenseridae (e.g., sturgeon) or salmonidae (salmon). The word means "fish" in Turkic languages (written balık in Turkish).

History
Over time, the term was applied to smoked fish of this kind, and one may see, e.g., "cold smoked hucho balyk." As a curiosity, recently a number of  cold smoked meat products branded "balyk" appeared in Russia. Traditionally, sturgeon balyk has been considered the most fine and tender one, sought and praised by gourmets. At the same time, the tender flesh of sturgeon is more susceptible to growth of Clostridium botulinum bacteria.

See also

 List of dried foods

References

Balyk 

Dried fish
Soviet cuisine
Russian cuisine